Digha is a seaside resort town in the state of West Bengal, India. It lies in Purba Medinipur district and at the northern end of the Bay of Bengal. It has a low gradient with a shallow sand beach. It is a popular sea resort in West Bengal.

History
Originally, there was a place called Beerkul, where Digha lies today. This name was referred in Warren Hastings's letters (1780) as Brighton of the East.

An English businessman John Frank Snaith started living here in 1923 and his writings provided a good exposure to this place. He convinced West Bengal Chief Minister Bidhan Chandra Roy to develop this place to be a beach resort. An old church can be seen near the Old Digha Main gate. This place is also known as Alankarpur Digha. A new mission has been developed in New Digha which is known as Sindhur Tara which is beside Amrabati Park its a Church where it is possible to wish for the welfare of family and loved ones. The best way to visit is to book a local van rickshaw. There are so many place where one can travel which give mental refreshments, like Tajpur, Odisa Border, Science City etc.

Geography

Location

Digha is connected to Kolkata/Howrah by a highway and a rail-link via Tamluk. Now many trains including Howrah-Digha Super AC express, Tamralipta express, Kandari express and EMU locals from Santragacchi via Mecheda and Tamluk run between Digha and Howarh and other stations in eastern India.It is also located under Contai Sub division.

Police stations
Digha police station has jurisdiction over part of Ramnagar I (part) CD Block. It covers an area of 3,153 km2 with a population of 35,054. It is located in old Digha.

Digha Mohana Coastal police station is located in Digha.

Urbanisation
93.55% of the population of Contai subdivision live in the rural areas. Only 6.45% of the population live in the urban areas and it is considerably behind Haldia subdivision in urbanization, where 20.81% of the population live in urban areas.

Note: The map alongside presents some of the notable locations in the subdivision. All places marked in the map are linked in the larger full screen map.

Hospital
There is a District Hospital near old Digha which provides good medical facilities. There is Contai Sub divisional Hospital and Sanjiban Hospital 31 k.m from Digha.

Climate
There are mainly five seasons in Digha, namely summer, monsoon, autumn, winter and spring. Although cold wind from the sea keeps the weather pleasant in this time. Next comes monsoon in July and lasts till the end of September. Digha generally experiences an average rainfall with high humidity in the monsoon season. Autumn sets in October and lasts till mid of December with an average temperature of around 25 degree Celsius. The weather remains very pleasant this time. Winter sets in the second half of December and lasts till mid February with an average temperature of 15/16 degree Celsius. The spring is the most enjoyable season in Digha starting from mid February to mid April. The hotels remain full of their capacity as tourist inflow is the highest in this peak season.

Transport

Bus service
There is frequent bus service to Digha from Dharmatala, Baruipur Garia and Joka bus stand of Kolkata, Burdwan, Bolpur, Siliguri, Asansol, Kirnahar, Baharampur, Serampore, Tarakeswar and many other parts of West Bengal. Buses are available from Howrah as well, a connection has been made from Sealdah to Digha where a private bus arrives at 8:30 am throughout the week. It takes the shortest route from Sealdah connecting S.N Banerjee road, Taltala, Wellington, Dharmatala to Howrah station, it departs from Howrah Station within 5 min to Digha. Digha is connected to Kolkata Metropolitan Area with E17 (Barasat), E17/1 (Barasat), E19 (Habra), E19D (Dumdum station), E45 (Joka), E46 (Saltlake Karunamoyee), E54 (Sreerampore), E55 (Madhyamgram), E56 (Baduria), ACT5 (Barasat), ACT8 (Habra), ACT9 (Saltlake Karunamoyee), ST31 (Dharmatala) etc.

Train service
In 2004, train services have started for Digha railway station (Station Code : DGHA). There was a one DMU service from Santragachi railway station but it discontinued. Now there are three new trains from Howrah Station too.

Air
 Digha Heliport

Area

Digha's old beach is not as wide as it used to be due to heavy soil erosion. Big stones and concrete steps are used to hold together the beach. Another problem is the record number of storm surges that have caused many of the unplanned shacks and smaller hotels to succumb to the sea. Since it is one of very few popular beaches in West Bengal, it gets overcrowded, especially during the cooler winter break.

This new beach is not only bigger than the old one, but might be considered a better one. It is clean and well-maintained and is not surrounded by a congested locality like the older beach. The latest attraction of New Digha is the Science Centre established by the National Council of Science Museums. The entire stretch of the Digha seaface from Old Digha to New Digha is filled with casuarina plantations.

Places of interest

Marine Aquarium and Research Centre (MARC)
It was established in the year 1989 during the Seventh Five Year Plan. The major objective of the Centre is to display the marine biodiversity of the region and impart its values to the common people and to carryout the research activities.

Shiva Temple At Chandaneswar
Chandaneswar is part of Odisha. During the Bengali month of Chaitra, an annual fair is organised here. Nearly half million people and pilgrims visit the temple.

Gallery

Old Digha

New Digha

Around Digha

References

External links 

 Digha Beach Website
 BOOK Bakkhali Tour Package With Bakkhali Tourist Lodge
 West Bengal Tourism site on Digha 
 

Cities and towns in Purba Medinipur district
Tourist attractions in Purba Medinipur district
Populated coastal places in India
Beaches of West Bengal